Kathleen Clark Hoyt (born June 6, 1942) is an American politician who served as chief of staff to Vermont governors Madeleine Kunin and Howard Dean and as Vermont Secretary of Administration. She was appointed to the Vermont House of Representatives in 2013 by Governor Peter Shumlin but chose not to run for reelection due to illness. She attended the University of North Carolina at Greensboro and was married to state representative Norris Hoyt in 1974.

References

External links

1942 births
Living people
Democratic Party members of the Vermont House of Representatives
State cabinet secretaries of Vermont
21st-century American politicians
21st-century American women politicians